Zhouzhuang (周庄镇) might refer to four towns in China:

 Zhouzhuang, Baofeng County, in Baofeng County, Henan
 Zhouzhuang, Jiangyin, in Jiangyin City, Jiangsu
 Zhouzhuang, Kunshan, Jiangsu
 Zhouzhuang, Xinghua, Jiangsu, in Xinghua City, Jiangsu